The Cliffside Lake Recreation Area is located in Nantahala National Forest in the Appalachian Mountains of North Carolina. It offers both fishing and swimming  and is less than ten miles northwest of Highlands, North Carolina on State Road 28.

References

Parks in North Carolina
Protected areas of Macon County, North Carolina
Nantahala National Forest